The Nord 1400 Noroit was a French reconnaissance and air-sea rescue flying boat designed and built by Nord Aviation for the French Navy.

Development
The Noroit was an amphibian flying boat designed for the French Navy, a cantilever gullwing monoplane with a two-step hull. It had a cantilever horizontal tail surface with three vertical surfaces. It had an enclosed cabin for the seven crew with a large cabin in the rear for use in rescue operations. The aircraft had two engines located one on each wing leading edge. The prototype as a flying boat first flew on 6 January 1949 powered by two  Gnome-Rhône 14R radial engines. The second aircraft was fitted with a retractable tailwheel landing gear for amphibious operation which was later retrofitted to the prototype. The next two aircraft first flown in 1949  were designated the Nord 1401 Noroit and were fitted with two  Junkers Jumo 213 engines and both were also tested with two Bristol Hercules radial engines. These two aircraft were modified to production standard as the Nord 1402 Noroit and were followed by 21 production aircraft. The last aircraft was delivered to the French Navy in 1956.

Variants
Nord N.1400 Noroit
Two prototypes with  Gnome-Rhône 14R radial engines.
Nord N.1400-01
The first N.1400 Noroit prototype.
Nord N.1400-02
The second N.1400 Noroit prototype.
Nord N.1401 Noroit
Two pre-production aircraft with  Junkers Jumo 213 engines, later modified to 1402 standard.
Nord N.1402 Noroit
Production variant, powered by  Arsenal 12H engines; 21 built plus two 1401 pre-production aircraft modified.

Operators

French Navy
Escadrille 5F

Specifications (1402)

See also

References

 
 

1940s French military reconnaissance aircraft
Flying boats
Noroit
Gull-wing aircraft
High-wing aircraft
Aircraft first flown in 1949
Twin piston-engined tractor aircraft